Nafija Sarajlić (née Hadžikarić; 3 October 1893 – 15 January 1970) was the first female Bosnian prose writer, with 23 short stories published between 1912 and 1918. She married writer Šemsudin Sarajlić and had five children. Her hectic personal life prevented her from developing her short stories into full-length novels. Sarajlić abandoned her work and withdrew from public life following the sudden death of her eldest daughter Halida in 1918.

Early life
Nafija Hadžikarić was born around 1893 in Sarajevo, Bosnia and Herzegovina, into a Bosniak family of fine craftsmen. She was one of eight children—three sons and five daughters. Her father Avdija Hadžikarić did not hesitate to educate his female children, an unusual act among Muslims in the 19th century. His five daughters were educated in Sarajevo to become teachers, albeit under unfavorable circumstances; doing homework by the light of tallow candles and walking great lengths daily to school. After allowing his daughters to be educated, her father could not enter the Baščaršija for months without being confronted about it or having rocks thrown at him. Nafija worked for three years as an elementary school teacher.

Immediately before the breakout of World War I Sarajlić began publishing her short stories that she called Teme (Themes) through publisher Bekir Kalajdžić. Her first story Rastanak was published in the Mostar-based magazine Zeman in 1912. The rest of her short stories were published in the magazine Biser, with full support from the editor Musa Ćazim Ćatić.

Writing style
Sarajlić, as the sole representative of Bosnian literature in the Austro-Hungarian period, matched the literary tendencies of that period even though she stayed in the literary world very briefly. She published a collection of stories before and during the First World War. The literature itself in this historical period tried to Europeanize the Bosnian culture and its people in accordance with the spirit of the new times.

In 1978, writer Muris Idrizović said that her Teme series "appear as live observations" and said that Sarajlić was an "observer of life, an analyst". Her work covered multiple topics and social issues of the time: the displacement of Bosniaks during World War I, superstition, poverty, and social backwardness.

Personal life
Aged 17, Nafija Hadžikarić married writer Šemsudin Sarajlić. The marriage did not interrupt her passion for education, but it did prompt the young woman to herself begin writing. Together they had five children: Halida (born 1912), Halid (born 1914), Džemal (born 1918), Abdurahman (born 1920) and Nedveta (born 1925). Their eldest daughter Halida died in 1918, aged six. Following the death of her oldest child, Sarajlić never wrote again and withdrew from public life. The grief of the loss of her child left her bedridden for months.

Nafija became a widow after 50 years of marriage in 1960.

Death
Sarajlić died on 15 January 1970 in Sarajevo. Shortly after her death, writer Alija Isaković said "When she died, quietly as she had lived, no one except a small number of friends and admirers, knew that the first prose writer among Muslim women had died."

Bibliography
Rastanak (Parting, 1912)
Nekoliko stranica tebi (A Few Pages for You, 1918)
Kokošija pamet (A Chicken's Memory)
Kamen na cesti (Rock on the Road)
Jedan čas (One Class)

References

1893 births
1970 deaths
Writers from Sarajevo
Bosniaks of Bosnia and Herzegovina
Bosniak writers
Bosniak poets
Bosnia and Herzegovina women poets
20th-century Bosnia and Herzegovina writers
20th-century Bosnia and Herzegovina women writers